In linear algebra (and its application to quantum mechanics), a raising or lowering operator (collectively known as ladder operators) is an operator that increases or decreases the eigenvalue of another operator.  In quantum mechanics, the raising operator is sometimes called the creation operator, and the lowering operator the annihilation operator. Well-known applications of ladder operators in quantum mechanics are in the formalisms of the quantum harmonic oscillator and angular momentum.

Terminology 

There is some confusion regarding the relationship between the raising and lowering ladder operators and the creation and annihilation operators commonly used in quantum field theory.  The creation operator ai† increments the number of particles in state i, while the corresponding annihilation operator ai decrements the number of particles in state i.  This clearly satisfies the requirements of the above definition of a ladder operator: the incrementing or decrementing of the eigenvalue of another operator (in this case the particle number operator).

Confusion arises because the term ladder operator is typically used to describe an operator that acts to increment or decrement a quantum number describing the state of a system.  To change the state of a particle with the creation/annihilation operators of QFT requires the use of both annihilation and creation operators. An annihilation operator is used to remove a particle from the initial state and a creation operator is used to add a particle to the final state.

The term "ladder operator" is also sometimes used in mathematics, in the context of the theory of Lie algebras and in particular the affine Lie algebras, to describe the su(2) subalgebras, from which the root system and the highest weight modules can be constructed by means of the ladder operators. In particular, the highest weight is annihilated by the raising operators; the rest of the positive root space is obtained by repeatedly applying the lowering operators (one set of ladder operators per subalgebra).

General formulation 

Suppose that two operators X and N have the commutation relation,

for some scalar c.  If  is an eigenstate of N with eigenvalue equation,

In other words, if  is an eigenstate of N with eigenvalue n then  is an eigenstate of N with eigenvalue n + c or it is zero. The operator X is a raising operator for N if c is real and positive, and a lowering operator for N if c is real and negative.

If N is a Hermitian operator then c must be real and the Hermitian adjoint of X obeys the commutation relation:

In particular, if X is a lowering operator for N then X† is a raising operator for N and vice versa.

Angular momentum 

A particular application of the ladder operator concept is found in the quantum mechanical treatment of angular momentum.  For a general angular momentum vector, J, with components, Jx, Jy and Jz one defines the two ladder operators, J+ and J–,

where i is the imaginary unit.

The commutation relation between the cartesian components of any angular momentum operator is given by

where εijk is the Levi-Civita symbol and each of i, j and k can take any of the values x, y and z.

From this, the commutation relations among the ladder operators and Jz are obtained,

(Technically, this is the Lie algebra of ).

The properties of the ladder operators can be determined by observing how they modify the action of the Jz operator on a given state,

Compare this result with

This illustrates the defining feature of ladder operators in quantum mechanics: the incrementing (or decrementing) of a quantum number, thus mapping one quantum state onto another.  This is the reason that they are often known as raising and lowering operators.

To obtain the values of α and β first take the norm of each operator, recognizing that J+ and J− are a Hermitian conjugate pair,

The product of the ladder operators can be expressed in terms of the commuting pair J2 and Jz,

Thus, one may express the values of |α|2 and |β|2 in terms of the eigenvalues of J2 and Jz,

The phases of α and β are not physically significant, thus they can be chosen to be positive and real (Condon-Shortley phase convention).  We then have:

Confirming that m is bounded by the value of j, one has

The above demonstration is effectively the construction of the Clebsch-Gordan coefficients.

Applications in atomic and molecular physics 
Many terms in the Hamiltonians of atomic or molecular systems involve the scalar product of angular momentum operators.  An example is the magnetic dipole term in the hyperfine Hamiltonian,

where I is the nuclear spin.

The angular momentum algebra can often be simplified by recasting it in the spherical basis.  Using the notation of spherical tensor operators, the "-1", "0" and "+1" components of J(1) ≡ J are given by,

From these definitions, it can be shown that the above scalar product can be expanded as

The significance of this expansion is that it clearly indicates which states are coupled by this term in the Hamiltonian, that is those with quantum numbers differing by mi = ±1 and mj = ∓1 only.

Harmonic oscillator 

Another application of the ladder operator concept is found in the quantum mechanical treatment of the harmonic oscillator. We can define the lowering and raising operators as

They provide a convenient means to extract energy eigenvalues without directly solving the system's differential equation.

Hydrogen-like atom 

There are two main approaches given in the literature using ladder operators, one using the Laplace–Runge–Lenz vector, another using factorization
of the Hamiltonian.

Laplace–Runge–Lenz vector 
Another application of the ladder operator concept is found in the quantum mechanical treatment of the electronic energy of hydrogen-like atoms and ions.
The Laplace–Runge–Lenz vector commutes with the Hamiltonian for an inverse square spherically symmetric potential and can be used to determine ladder operators
for this potential.
We can define the lowering and raising operators (based on the classical Laplace–Runge–Lenz vector)

The commutators needed to proceed are:

and
.
Therefore,

and

so

where the "?" indicates a nascent quantum number which emerges from the discussion.

Given the Pauli equations
Pauli Equation IV:

and Pauli Equation III:

and starting with the equation

and expanding,
one obtains (assuming  is the maximum value of the angular momentum quantum number consonant with all other conditions),

which leads to the Rydberg formula:

implying that , where  is the traditional quantum number.

Factorization of the Hamiltonian 

The Hamiltonian for a hydrogen-like potential can be written in spherical coordinates as

where 

which is real and self-conjugate.

Suppose  is an eigenvector of the Hamiltonian where  is the angular momentum
and  represents the energy, so  and we may label
the Hamiltonian as 

The factorization method was developed by Infeld and Hull for differential equations.
Newmarch and Golding
applied it to spherically symmetric potentials using operator notation.

Suppose we can find a factorization of the Hamiltonian by operators  as

and

The vector  may be evaluated in two different ways as

which can be re-arranged as

If  then  and the states  and 
have the same energy.

For the hydrogenic atom, setting

with

with

There is an upper bound to the ladder operator if the energy is negative, (so 
for some ) then
from Equation

and  can be identified with

Relation to group theory 
Whenever there is degeneracy in a system, there is usually a related symmetry property and group.
The degeneracy of the energy levels for the same value of  but different angular momenta has been identified as the SO(4) symmetry of the spherically symmetric Coulomb potential.

3D isotropic harmonic oscillator 
The 3D isotropic harmonic oscillator has a potential given by

It can similarly be managed using the factorization method.

Factorization method 

A suitable factorization is given by

with

and

Then

and continuing this,

Now the Hamiltonian only has positive energy levels as can be seen from

This means that for some value of  the series must terminate with

and then

. Identifying this value as 
gives

It then follows the  so that

There is degeneracy caused from angular momentum; there is additional degeneracy caused by the oscillator potential.
Consider the states 
and apply the lowering operators :
 giving the sequence 
with the same energy but with  decreasing by 2.
In addition to the angular momentum degeneracy, this gives a total degeneracy of

Relation to group theory 
The degeneracies of the 3D isotropic harmonic oscillator are related to the special unitary group SU(3)

History 
Many sources credit Dirac with the invention of ladder operators.

See also
 Creation and annihilation operators
 Quantum harmonic oscillator
 Chevalley basis

References 

Quantum mechanics

de:Erzeugungs- und Vernichtungsoperator